Albert Allen (born  Aston, Birmingham on 1 April 1867, died 13 October 1899) was a football player in the early years of professional football in England, who played as an inside-forward with Aston Villa. He made one appearance for England on 7 April 1888 when he scored three goals in a 5–1 victory over Ireland, thus making him one of the five England players who scored a hat trick on his only international appearance.

Season 1888-89
He first joined Villa in August 1884 (before the foundation of the Football League), played in the first Villa League team to debut at Dudley Road, Wolverhampton, then home of Wolverhampton Wanderer's. The match ended 1-1. He scored Villa's first Football League hat-trick in a 9–1 home win over Notts County on 29 September 1888, his debut League goal was on 15 September 1888 at Wellington Road, in a 5–1 win over Stoke. When he made his League debut he was 21 years 146 days old; that made him, on that first day of League football, Aston Villa's youngest league player. Allen only missed one League match, out of 22, and top-scored in 1888–1889 with 18 League goals and 1 in the FA Cup. Played as a forward in a forward line that scored three-League-goals-or-more-in-a-match on six separate occasions. Developed an understanding with Dennis Hodgetts. 

In the second League season (1889-90) Allen scored eight League goals from 19 League Appearances. Allen scored a second League hat-trick in a 6-2 win at Turf Moor, the home of Burnley, on 5 October 1889. Allen was joint club top-scorer with Billy Dickson and Dennis (Denny) Hodgetts. Aston Villa had a poor season and finished 8th (out of 12).

In 1890-91, another poor season for Aston Villa, finishing 9th in the League, Allen only played four matches scoring once.

He made 44 league appearances for Aston Villa, scoring 27 goals. He died of tuberculosis, which had ended his career prematurely, aged 32.

Statistics
Source:

References

External links
Aston Villa Player Database, Albert Allen's AVFC Bio

English footballers
England international footballers
Aston Villa F.C. players
Footballers from Birmingham, West Midlands
1867 births
1899 deaths
English Football League players
Association football inside forwards